Võru County Vocational Training Centre (VCVTC or Võrumaa Kutsehariduskeskus in Estonian) is an educational institution in Väimela, Võrumaa, South-Estonia, which offers secondary vocational education and pre-training study programmes.

History
VCVTC was established in September 1999 as a result of a merger of two schools – Väimela Agricultural Technical School and Võru Industrial Technical School. Võru Industrial Technical School was a successor of the Võru Industrial School, established in 1925, which had been specialising in teaching the skills of wood and metal processing. Väimela Agricultural Technical School, which originates from the Võru Farming School, established in 1920 specialised in teaching agriculture.

While 410 students were enrolled in 1999, today this number has risen over 900.

Statistics
 Number of students: 920
 Number of instructors: 47
 Number of curricula: 16
 Area of study buildings: 6200 m²

Main curricula
Wood Processing Technology
Metal Processing
Mechatronics
Tourism and Catering Management
Business Management
Information Technology Systems

Awards and programmes
VCVTC is member of international ERASMUS charter.

Since 2008 VCVTC has been a member of the Estonian Students Association (EÜL).

References

External links

Official website

Higher education in Estonia
Schools in Estonia
Educational institutions established in 1999
Buildings and structures in Võru County
Võru Parish
1999 establishments in Estonia